Javier Rodríguez Segovia (born 22 December, 1964 in Saltillo, Coahuila) is a Mexican sport shooter. At the 2012 Summer Olympics he competed in the Men's skeet, finishing in 24th place.

References

Mexican male sport shooters
1964 births
Living people
Olympic shooters of Mexico
Shooters at the 2012 Summer Olympics
Sportspeople from Saltillo
Shooters at the 2015 Pan American Games
Pan American Games competitors for Mexico